Most Shocking is an American reality television show produced by Nash Entertainment and truTV Original Productions. A spin-off series entitled Top 20 Countdown: Most Shocking aired from 2006 to 2012.

The program held a TV-14 rating due to extremely violent situations depicted in the videos.

Synopsis
It generally features narrated videos of criminal behavior, police pursuits, robberies, riots, and freak accidents.

International broadcasts

Episodes

Syndication
The series currently reruns on True Crime Network as of October 26, 2015. The series currently air reruns on Reelz as of July 19, 2022.

See also 
Street Crime UK – a similar show with UK footage, also broadcast on Bravo.
Police Camera Action! – a similar programme broadcast on ITV1, ITV4, and Men & Motors.
Traffic Cops – sometimes broadcast as Car Wars. BBC One programme with similar format, also repeated on UKTV.
Road Wars – Broadcast on Sky1, Sky2, and Sky3.
Street Law – also known as Street Wars. Broadcast on Sky1, Sky2, and Sky3.
Most Daring – A spin-off series also made by Nash Entertainment.

References

External links 
 
truTV's "Most Shocking" Site, with Video Clips

2006 American television series debuts
2010 American television series endings
2000s American reality television series
English-language television shows
TruTV original programming
2000s American video clip television series
2010s American video clip television series
2010s American reality television series